Sa'ar may refer to:

Ship classes 
 Sa'ar 3-class missile boat
 Sa'ar 4-class missile boat
 Sa'ar 4.5-class missile boat
 Sa'ar 5-class corvette
 Sa'ar 6-class corvette
 Sa'ar 72-class corvette
 Sa'ar 62 class offshore patrol vessel

Other uses 
Gideon Sa'ar (born 1966), Israeli politician
 Sa'ar (kibbutz), a kibbutz in Israel

See also 
 Saar (disambiguation)